Sebastian Asch (born 4 June 1986 in Tübingen, lives in Ammerbuch, Baden-Württemberg) is a race car driver and the son of Roland Asch.

Starting his career in slalom and karting, he drove in the 2004 German Ford Fiesta Cup, driving the #8 car.

He raced is in the German SEAT León Cup from 2005 to 2007, then making a debut in the ADAC GT Masters in 2008. He was ADAC GT Masters champion in 2012 and 2015.

External links
Driver DB Profile

1986 births
German racing drivers
Living people
Racing drivers from Baden-Württemberg
24 Hours of Daytona drivers
Rolex Sports Car Series drivers
Blancpain Endurance Series drivers
International GT Open drivers
ADAC GT Masters drivers
24 Hours of Spa drivers
24H Series drivers

Mücke Motorsport drivers
Nürburgring 24 Hours drivers
Porsche Carrera Cup Germany drivers